The 2006 Men's Floorball Championships were the sixth men's Floorball World Championships. It was held in May 2006 in Sweden, with the host country defeating Finland in sudden victory in the gold medal game. Sweden thus continued its tradition of winning these championships, but for the first time in their history the team failed to win all games. Switzerland became the first team to accomplish a draw versus Sweden in a world championship game, and later won the bronze medal.

Championship results

Preliminary round

Group A

Group B

Final round

Semifinals

Bronze-medal match

Championship Match

Placement  round

9th-place match

7th-place match

5th-place match

Leading scorers

All-Star Team
Goalkeeper:  Henri Toivoniemi
Defense:     Henrik Quist,  Marcus Gerber
Forward:     Tero Tiitu,  Anders Hellgård,  Mika Kohonen

Ranking

Official 2006 Rankings according to the IFF

See also
2006 Men's World Floorball Championships B-Division
2006 Men's World Floorball Championships C-Division

References

External links
Official site
Tournament Statistics & Images

Floorball World Championships
Mens World Floorball Championships, 2006
Floorball
2006 in Swedish sport
May 2006 sports events in Europe
Sports competitions in Helsingborg
International sports competitions in Malmö
2000s in Malmö
Sports competitions in Solna
2000s in Stockholm
International sports competitions in Stockholm